Chinocossus vjet is a moth in the family Cossidae. It was described by Yakovlev in 2006. It is found in Vietnam.

The length of the forewings is about 22 mm. The wing s are brown. The hindwings are brown with grey strokes between the veins.

References

Natural History Museum Lepidoptera generic names catalog

Cossinae
Moths described in 2006
Moths of Asia